Monita Tahalea is an Indonesian pop, folk and jazz singer. She is known for finishing fourth on Indonesian Idol season 2. She is a singer & songwriter.

Career
Monita was born in Jakarta.  She began her singing career after finishing in fourth place on Indonesia Idol season 2. 
Later on, an Indonesia Idol judge, Indra Lesmana took interest in producing her first album titled 'Dream, Hope and Faith" in 2010.
In August 2013 she released an EP Songs of Praise with her band The Nightingales.
In December 2015, Monita released her second album titled "Dandelion" that she produced together with Gerald Situmorang.
And in March 2020 she has just released her third album Dari Balik Jendela” produced by Indra Perkasa. Monita Tahalea received The 43rd JGTC Artist Choice of The Year 2020. Through this album, Monita Tahalea was included in two nominations at Anugerah Musik Indonesia 2020. Best alternative singer and best album cover. Dari Balik Jendela was named the best album cover at AMI 2020.</ref>

</ref>
Andrian hidayat

Discography
Solo Album
 Dream, Hope and Faith (2010)
 Songs of Praise (2013)
 Dandelion (2016)
 Dari Balik Jendela (2020)

Compilation Album
 Seri Cinta: KELIRU (2005)
 SATU KATA Andre Hehanusa, Monita Tahalea (2005)
 Kemenangan Hati: KEKASIH SEJATI, SELINGKUH Yovie Widianto, Monita Tahalea (2007)
 Kembali Satu (2008)
 Kompilasi Kembali Satu: DIBATAS MIMPI (2008)
 Halo Aci: Indonesia Pusaka (2011)
 Tropicana Slim: Remember My Sweet Moments (2012)
 An Urban Christmas: Gita Sorga Bergema Barry Likumahuw, Monita Tahalea (2011)
 SILENT NIGHT: Indra Lesmana, Dewa Budjana, Monita Tahalea (2013)
 OST. Adriana: LEPAS Indra Lesmana, Monita Tahalea (2013)
 OST. Adriana: MAYBE (2013)
 Gift of Light: Barry Likumahuwa, Monita Tahalea (2015)
 OST. Filosofi Kopi: FILOSOFI & LOGIKA Glenn Fredly, Monita Tahalea, Is (2015)
 Nivea: I Love Mama (2015)
 Album Aransemen Ulang Film Tiga Dara: CITA-CITA (2016)
 Like Father Like Son: WISH MY BABY Benny Likumahuwa, Monita Tahalea (2017)
 BUKALAH HATI Igor Saykoji, Gabriela Cristy, Monita Tahalea (2017)
 SAMPAI USAI WAKTU Sandhy Sondoro, Monita Tahalea (2018)
 HADIRMU Bayu Risa ft. Monita Tahalea (2018)
 SESAAT YANG ABADI, OST. Mantan Manten (2018)
 Album Detik Waktu Candra Darusman: PERKENALAN PERDANA (2018)
 BICARA The Overtunes ft. Monita Tahalea (2018)
 RAINING FLOWERS Gerald Situmorang, Monita Tahalea, Sri Hanuraga (2019)
 DULU Bunglon, Monita Tahalea (2019)
 MALAM TANPA MIMPI Monita Tahalea, Sri Hanuraga (2019)
 OST. Aruna & Lidahnya: ANTARA KITA (2019)
 Hymns With Gratitude: Albert Fakdawer, Monita Tahalea (2020)
 TAPAK HENING (2020)
 LAILA (2021)
 SAYONARA (2021)
 KITA BERANGKAT SAJA DULU Ananda Badudu ft. Monita Tahalea (2021)
 APA MIMPIMU? Ananda Badudu ft. Monita Tahalea (2021)

References

Living people
21st-century Indonesian women singers
Indonesian jazz singers
Indonesian pop singers
Indonesian people of Austrian descent
Indo people
Moluccan people
Minahasa people
Folk-pop singers
Trisakti University alumni
Year of birth missing (living people)